The acronym ETFC may refer to:

 Eastwood Town F.C.
 Edgware Town F.C.
 Egham Town F.C.
 Enfield Town F.C.
 Erith Town F.C.
 Exmouth Town F.C.
 E-Trade Financial Corporation